Huckleberry Finn and His Friends is a 1979 television series documenting the exploits of Huckleberry Finn and Tom Sawyer, based on the novels The Adventures of Tom Sawyer (1876) and Adventures of Huckleberry Finn (1884) by American writer Mark Twain. 
The series is made up of 26 episodes and was a Canadian/West German international co-production.

Plot
Even though Mark Twain originally wrote the books The Adventures of Tom Sawyer and The Adventures of Huckleberry Finn as separate units, this series conjures up both literary works as only one story. Therefore, it places greater importance on Huckleberry's character without putting aside Tom Sawyer's.

Cast
 Ian Tracey as Huckleberry Finn/Narrator
 Sam Snyders as Tom Sawyer
 Brigitte Horney as Aunt Polly
Dinah Hinz as Aunt Sally
 Holly Findlay as Becky Thatcher
 Blu Mankuma as Jim

Episodes

 Welcome Neighbour
 Love in Bloom
 Engagement
 Mystery at Midnight
 The Pirates
 How Nice to Be Missed
 Such a Lovely Funeral
 Muff Potter's Trial
 Buried Treasure
 Huck Is a Hero
 Millionaires
 I Want to Be Free
 Huck Becomes the Victim
 Huck Gets Away
 Huck Finds Jim
 The Rains Come
 Smallpox
 Meet the Grangerfords
 The Thing About Feuding
 The End of the Feud
 Meet the Duke And Dauphin
 Romeo Where Art Thou
 Jim Disappears
 Huck Sawyer - Tom Finn
 The Rescue
 The Whole Truth

Production

Filming
The series was directed by Jack B. Hively and Ken Jubenvill.

Huckleberry Finn and His Friends was filmed on location at the Burnaby Village Museum (then known as the Heritage Village) in Burnaby, British Columbia, Canada. Episode 9 - Buried treasure - was filmed in part at the Alaksen National Wildlife Area.

Sternwheelers
Various sternwheeler riverboats appear in the series. The Julia Belle Swain appears in the opening and closing credits, and are in fact the only scenes that were actually shot on the Mississippi River.

The wooden steam-powered sternwheeler in episode 6 - How nice to be missed - and 7 - Such a lovely funeral - is the "Samson V". The "Samson V" is now a museum but at the time (1979) was a working snagpuller on the Fraser River. The small sternwheeler in episode 10 - Huck is a hero - was one of an identical pair of boats built in 1964 that ferried tourists around Vancouver's harbour from the 1960s to the 1980s. From the late 1980s until 1999, the "Scenic Bell" and the "Scenic Queen" ferried passengers to Newcastle Island Marine Provincial Park.

Broadcast
The series was broadcast in many countries such as the United Kingdom, Germany, Ireland, Belgium, The Netherlands, Finland, Sweden, Denmark, Australia, Canada, South Africa, Israel, Venezuela and many other Latin American nations.

In the United Kingdom, it was first screened on BBC1 in 1982 in two halves in the Spring and Autumn seasons. It was repeated again during the summer of 1984.

The series was re-shown many times during the 1980s to early 1990s and has grown somewhat of a cult following.

Home media
In 2007, the complete series was released as a 4 DVD box set by Fabulous Films in the UK. It contains many extras including a 12-page colour booklet and a 30-minute 'making of' documentary featuring interviews with many stars of the series including Sammy Snyders, Ian Tracey, and Blu Mankuma.

References

External links

Works based on The Adventures of Tom Sawyer
1970s Canadian children's television series
Television shows filmed in Burnaby
Canadian television shows based on children's books
1979 Canadian television series debuts
Television series set in the 19th century
English-language television shows
Works based on Adventures of Huckleberry Finn
Television shows based on works by Mark Twain